This is a list of foreign ministers in 2020.

Africa
  – Sabri Boukadoum (2019–2021)
  –
Manuel Domingos Augusto (2017–2020)
Tete António (2020–present)
  – Aurélien Agbénonci (2016–present)
  –
Unity Dow (2018–2020)
Lemogang Kwape (2020–present)
  – Alpha Barry (2016–2021)
  –
Ezéchiel Nibigira (2018–2020)
Albert Shingiro (2020–present)
  - Lejeune Mbella Mbella (2015–present)
  – Luís Felipe Tavares (2016–2021)
  – Sylvie Baïpo-Temon (2018–present)
  –
Mahamat Zene Cherif (2017–2020)
Amine Abba Sidick (2020–2021)
  –
Mohamed El-Amine Souef (2017–2020)
Dhoihir Dhoulkamal (2020–present)
  – Jean-Claude Gakosso (2015–present)
  – Marie Tumba Nzeza (2019–2021)
  – Mahamoud Ali Youssouf (2005–present)
  – Sameh Shoukry (2014–present)
  – Simeón Oyono Esono Angue (2018–present)
  – Osman Saleh Mohammed (2007–present)
  –
Gedu Andargachew (2019–2020)
Demeke Mekonnen (2020–present)
  –
Alain Claude Bilie-By-Nze (2019–2020)
Pacôme Moubelet Boubeya (2020–2022)
  – Mamadou Tangara (2018–present)
  – Shirley Ayorkor Botchway (2017–present)
  – Mamadi Touré (2017–2021)
  –
Suzi Barbosa (2019–2020)
Ruth Monteiro (2020)
Suzi Barbosa (2020–present)
  –
Marcel Amon Tanoh (acting to 2017) (2016–2020)
Ally Coulibaly (2020–2021)
  – 
Monica Juma (2018–2020)
Raychelle Omamo (2020–present)
  –
Lesego Makgothi (2017–2020)
’Matšepo Ramakoae (2020–present)
  –
Gbehzohngar Findley (2018–2020)
Dee-Maxwell Saah Kemayah, Sr (2020–present)

Government of House of Representatives of Libya (Government of Libya internationally recognized to 2016) – Abdulhadi Elhweg (2019–2021)
 Government of National Accord of Libya (Interim government internationally recognized as the sole legitimate government of Libya from 2016) – Mohamed Taha Siala (2016–2021)
  –
Naina Andriantsitohaina (2019–2020)
Djacoba Liva Tehindrazanarivelo (2020–2021)
  – 
 Francis Kasaila (2019–2020)
Peter Mutharika (2020)
Kondwani Nankhumwa (2020)
Eisenhower Mkaka (2020–2022)
  –
Tiébilé Dramé (2019–2020)
Zeïni Moulaye (2020–2021)
  – Ismail Ould Cheikh Ahmed (2018–present)
  – Nando Bodha (2019–2021)
  – Nasser Bourita (2017–present)
  – 
José Condungua Pacheco (2017–2020)
Verónica Macamo (2020–present)
  – Netumbo Nandi-Ndaitwah (2012–present)
  –
Kalla Ankourao (2018–2020)
Marou Amadou (acting) (2020–2021)
  – Geoffrey Onyeama (2015–present)
  – Vincent Biruta (2019–present)
  – Mohamed Salem Ould Salek (1998–2023)
  –
Elsa Teixeira Pinto (2018–2020)
Edite Tenjua (2020–present)
  –
Amadou Ba (2019–2020)
Aïssata Tall Sall (2020–present)
  –
Vincent Meriton (2018–2020)
Sylvestre Radegonde (2020–present)
  – Nabeela Tunis (2019–2021)
  –
Ahmed Isse Awad (2018–2020)
Mohamed Abdirizak Mohamud (2020–2021)
  – 
Yasin Haji Mohamoud (2018–2020)
Essa Kayd (2020–present)
  – Naledi Pandor (2019–present)
  –
Awut Deng Acuil (2019–2020)
Beatrice Wani-Noah (2020–2021)
  –
Asma Mohamed Abdalla (2019–2020)
Omar Ismail Gamar Aldin (acting) (2020–2021)
  – Thuli Dladla (2018–present)
  – Palamagamba John Aidan Mwaluko Kabudi (2019–2021)
  – Robert Dussey (2013–present)
  –
Sabri Bachtabji (acting) (2019–2020)
Noureddine Erray (2020)
Salma Ennaifer (acting) (2020)
Othman Jerandi (2020–present)
  – Sam Kutesa (2005–2021)
  – Joe Malanji (2018–2021)
  – Sibusiso Moyo (2017–2021)

Asia
  – Daur Kove (2016–2021)
  –
Idrees Zaman (acting) (2019–2020)
Haroon Chakhansuri (acting) (2020)
Mohammad Hanif Atmar (2020–2021)
  –
Zohrab Mnatsakanian (2018–2020)
Ara Ayvazyan (2020–2021)
  – Masis Mayilyan (2017–2021)
  – 
Elmar Mammadyarov (2004–2020)
Jeyhun Bayramov (2020–present)
  –
Sheikh Khalid ibn Ahmad Al Khalifah (2005–2020)
Abdullatif bin Rashid Al Zayani (2020–present)
  – Abulkalam Abdul Momen (2019–present)
  – Tandi Dorji (2018–present)
  – Hassanal Bolkiah (2015–present)
  – Prak Sokhonn (2016–present)
  – Wang Yi (2013–present)
  –
Dionísio Babo Soares (2018–2020)
Adaljíza Magno (2020–present)
  – Davit Zalkaliani (2018–present)
  – Subrahmanyam Jaishankar (2019–present)
  – Retno Marsudi (2014–present)
  – Mohammad Javad Zarif (2013–2021)
  –
Mohamed Ali Alhakim (2018–2020)
Mustafa Al-Kadhimi (acting) (2020)
Fuad Hussein (2020–present)
  – Safeen Muhsin Dizayee (2019–present)
  –
Yisrael Katz (2019–2020)
Gabi Ashkenazi (2020–2021)
  – Toshimitsu Motegi (2019–2021)
  – Ayman Safadi (2017–present)
  – Mukhtar Tleuberdi (2019–present)
  –
Ri Yong-ho (2016–2020)
Ri Son-gwon (2020–present)
  – Kang Kyung-wha (2017–2021)
  – Sheikh Ahmad Nasser Al Muhammad Al Sabah (2019–present)
  –
Chingiz Aidarbekov (2018–2020)
Ruslan Kazakbayev (2020–present)
  – Saleumxay Kommasith (2016–present)
  – 
Gebran Bassil (2014–2020)
Nassif Hitti (2020)
Charbel Wehbe (2020–2021)
  –
Saifuddin Abdullah (2018–2020)
Hishammuddin Hussein (2020–2021)
  – Abdulla Shahid (2018–present)
  –
Damdin Tsogtbaatar (2017–2020)
Nyamtseren Enkhtaivan (2020–2021)
  – Aung San Suu Kyi (2016–2021)
  – Pradeep Gyawali (2018–2021)
  –
Yusuf bin Alawi bin Abdullah (1982–2020)
Sayyid Badr bin Hamad bin Hamood Al Busaidi (2020–present)
  – Shah Mehmood Qureshi (2018–present)
  – Riyad al-Maliki (2007–present)
  – Teodoro Locsin Jr. (2018–2022)
  – Sheikh Mohammed bin Abdulrahman Al Thani (2016–present)

  – Prince Faisal bin Farhan Al Saud (2019–present)
  – Vivian Balakrishnan (2015–present)
  – Dmitry Medoyev (2017–present)
  – Dinesh Gunawardena (2019–2021)
  –
Walid Muallem (2006–2020)
Faisal Mekdad (2020–present)
  – Joseph Wu (2018–present)
  – Sirodjidin Aslov (2013–present)
  – Don Pramudwinai (2015–present)
  – Mevlüt Çavuşoğlu (2015–present)
  – Raşit Meredow (2001–present)
  – Sheikh Abdullah bin Zayed Al Nahyan (2006–present)
  – Abdulaziz Komilov (2012–present)
  – Phạm Bình Minh (2011–2021)

Republic of Yemen –
Mohammed A. Al-Hadhramii (2019–2020)
Ahmad Awad Bin Mubarak (2020–present)
Supreme Political Council (unrecognised, rival government) – Hisham Abdullah (2016–present)

Europe
  –
Edi Rama (2019–2020)
Olta Xhaçka (2020–present)
  – Maria Ubach i Font (2017–present)
  – Alexander Schallenberg (2019–2021)
 Belarus
  – Vladimir Makei (2012–present)
 National Anti-Crisis Management (‘Shadow-government-like" organisation) - Anatoly Kotov (2020–present)
  –
Philippe Goffin (2019–2020)
Sophie Wilmès (2020–present)
  - Pascal Smet (2019–present)
  - Jan Jambon (2019–present)
  Wallonia - Elio Di Rupo (2019–present)
  – Bisera Turković (2019–present)
  – Ekaterina Zakharieva (2017–2021)
  – Gordan Grlić-Radman (2019–present)
  – Nikos Christodoulides (2018–2022)
  – Tomáš Petříček (2018–2021)
  – Jeppe Kofod (2019–present)
  – Jenis av Rana (2019–present)
  Donetsk People's Republic – Natalya Nikonorova (2016–present)
  – Urmas Reinsalu (2019–2021)
  – Pekka Haavisto (2019–present)
  – Jean-Yves Le Drian (2017–present)
  – Heiko Maas (2018–2021)
  – Nikos Dendias (2019–present)
  – Jonathan Le Tocq (2016–present)
  – Péter Szijjártó (2014–present)
  – Guðlaugur Þór Þórðarson (2017–2021)
  – Simon Coveney (2017–present)
  – Luigi Di Maio (2019–present)
  – Ian Gorst (2018–present)
  –
Behgjet Pacolli (2017–2020)
Glauk Konjufca (2020)
Meliza Haradinaj-Stublla (2020–2021)
  – Edgars Rinkēvičs (2011–present)
  – Katrin Eggenberger (2019–present)
  –
Linas Antanas Linkevičius (2012–2020)
Gabrielius Landsbergis (2020–present)
  Lugansk People's Republic – Vladislav Deinevo (2017–present)
  – Jean Asselborn (2004–present)
  –
Nikola Dimitrov (2017–2020)
Bujar Osmani (2020–present)
  –
Carmelo Abela (2017–2020)
Evarist Bartolo (2020–present)
  –
Aureliu Ciocoi (2019–2020)
Oleg Țulea (2020)
Aureliu Ciocoi (2020–present)
  Gagauzia – Vitaliy Vlah (2015–present)
  – Laurent Anselmi (2019–2022)
  –
Srđan Darmanović (2016–2020)
Đorđe Radulović (2020–present)
  – Stef Blok (2018–2021)
  –
Kudret Özersay (2018–2020)
Tahsin Ertuğruloğlu (2020–2022)
  – Ine Marie Eriksen Søreide (2017–2021)
  –
Jacek Czaputowicz (2018–2020)
Zbigniew Rau (2020–present)
  – Augusto Santos Silva (2015–present)
  – Bogdan Aurescu (2019–present)
  – Sergey Lavrov (2004–present)
  –
Nicola Renzi (2016–2020)
Luca Beccari (2020–present)
  –
Ivica Dačić (2014–2020)
Ana Brnabić (acting) (2020)
Nikola Selaković (2020–present)
  –
Miroslav Lajčák (2012–2020)
Richard Sulík (acting) (2020)
Ivan Korčok (2020–2021)
  –
Miro Cerar (2018–2020)
Anže Logar (2020–present)
  –
Margarita Robles (acting) (2019–2020)
Arancha González Laya (2020–2021)
  –
Alfred Bosch (2018–2020)
Teresa Jordà (acting) (2020)
Bernat Solé (2020–2021)
  – Ann Linde (2019–present)
  – Ignazio Cassis (2017–present)
  – Vitaly Ignatyev (2015–present)

  –
Vadym Prystaiko (2019–2020)
Dmytro Kuleba (2020–present)
  - Dominic Raab (2019–2021)
  – 
 Fiona Hyslop (2011–2020)
 Michael Russell (2020–2021)
  – Archbishop Paul Gallagher (2014–present)

North America and the Caribbean
  – E.P. Chet Greene (2018–present)
  – Darren Henfield (2017–2021)
  – Jerome Walcott (2018–present)
  –
Wilfred Elrington (2008–2020)
Eamon Courtenay (2020–present)
  – François-Philippe Champagne (2019–2021)
  Quebec – Nadine Girault (2018–present)
  –
Manuel Ventura (2019–2020)
Rodolfo Solano (2020–present)
  – Bruno Rodríguez Parrilla (2009–present)
  – Kenneth Darroux (2019–present)
  –
Miguel Vargas Maldonado (2016–2020)
Roberto Álvarez (2020–present)
  – Alexandra Hill Tinoco (2019–present)
  Greenland –
Ane Lone Bagger (2018–2020)
Steen Lynge (2020–2021)
  –
Peter David (2018–2020)
Oliver Joseph (2020–present)
 – 
Sandra Jovel (2017–2020)
Pedro Brolo (2020–2022)
  –
Bocchit Edmond (2018–2020)
Claude Joseph (2020–2021)
  – Lisandro Rosales (2019–2022)
  – Kamina Johnson-Smith (2016–present)
  – Marcelo Ebrard (2018–present)
  – Denis Moncada (2017–present)
  –
Alejandro Ferrer López (2019–2020)
Erika Mouynes (2020–present)
  –
Elmer Román (2019–2020)
Raúl Márquez Hernández (2020–2021)
  – Mark Brantley (2015–present)
  – Allen Chastanet (2016–2021)
  –
Sir Louis Straker (2015–2020)
Ralph Gonsalves (2020–present)
  –
Dennis Moses (2015–2020)
Amery Browne (2020–present)
  – Mike Pompeo (2018–2021)

Oceania
  – Marise Payne (2018–2022)
  –
Henry Puna (2013–2020)
Mark Brown (2013–present)
  –
Inia Seruiratu (2019–2020)
Frank Bainimarama (2020–present)
   – Édouard Fritch (2014–present)
  – Taneti Mamau (2016–present)
  –
John Silk (2016–2020)
Casten Nemra (2020–present)
  – Kandhi A. Elieisar (2019–present)
  – Lionel Aingimea (2019–present)
  –
Winston Peters (2017–2020)
Nanaia Mahuta (2020–present)
  –
Toke Talagi (2008–2020)
Dalton Tagelagi (2020–present)
  – Faustina Rehuher-Marugg (2017–2021)
  –
Patrick Pruaitch (2019–2020)
Soroi Eoe (2020–2022)
  – Tuilaepa Aiono Sailele Malielegaoi (1998–2021)
  – Jeremiah Manele (2019–present)
  –
Kerisiano Kalolo (2019–2020)
Fofo Tuisano (2020–2021)
  – Pohiva Tu'i'onetoa (2019–2021)
  – Simon Kofe (2019–present)
  –
Ralph Regenvanu (2017–2020)
Mark Ati (2020–present)

South America
  – Felipe Solá (2019–2021)
  –
Karen Longaric (2019–2020)
Rogelio Mayta (2020–present)
  – Ernesto Araújo (2019–2021)
  -
Teodoro Ribera (2019–2020)
Andrés Allamand (2020–2022)
  – Claudia Blum (2019–2021)
  –
José Valencia Amores (2018–2020)
Luis Gallegos (2020–2021)
  –
Karen Cummings (2019–2020)
Hugh Todd (2020–present)
  –
Antonio Rivas Palacios (2019–2020)
Federico González Franco (2020–2021)
  –
Gustavo Meza-Cuadra (2019–2020)
Mario López Chávarri (2020)
Franca Deza (2020)
Elizabeth Astete (2020–2021)
  –
Yldiz Pollack-Beighle (2017–2020)
Albert Ramdin (2020–present)
  – 
Rodolfo Nin Novoa (2015–2020)
Ernesto Talvi (2020)
Francisco Bustillo (2020–present)
  – Jorge Arreaza (2017–2021)

See also

List of current foreign ministers

References

Foreign ministers
2020 in international relations
Foreign ministers
2020